In machine learning, a Hyper basis function network, or HyperBF network, is a generalization of radial basis function (RBF) networks concept, where the Mahalanobis-like distance is used instead of Euclidean distance measure. Hyper basis function networks were first introduced by Poggio and Girosi in the 1990 paper “Networks for Approximation and Learning”.

Network Architecture

The typical HyperBF network structure consists of a real input vector , a hidden layer of activation functions and a linear output layer. The output of the network is a scalar function of the input vector, is given by 

The activation function  at the HyperBF network takes the following form

where  is a positive definite  matrix. Depending on the application, the following types of matrices  are usually considered
 , where . This case corresponds to the regular RBF network.
 , where . In this case, the basis functions are radially symmetric, but are scaled with different width.
 , where . Every neuron has an elliptic shape with a varying size.
 Positive definite matrix, but not diagonal.

Training

Poggio and Girosi (1990) describe the training method with moving centers and adaptable neuron shapes. The outline of the method is provided below.

Consider the quadratic loss of the network .  The following conditions must be satisfied at the optimum:
 

where . Then in the gradient descent method the values of  that minimize  can be found as a stable fixed point of the following dynamic system:

where  determines the rate of convergence.

Overall, training HyperBF networks can be computationally challenging. Moreover, the high degree of freedom of HyperBF leads to overfitting and poor generalization. However, HyperBF networks have an important advantage that a small number of neurons is enough for learning complex functions.

References

Artificial neural networks
Classification algorithms
Machine learning algorithms